Sister Elizabeth Anne Sueltenfuss (April 14, 1921 – December 19, 2009) was an American educator and Catholic sister.

Sueltenfuss was born on April 14, 1921 in San Antonio, Texas to Edward L. and Elizabeth Amrein Sueltenfuss. In 1941, she became a Sister of Divine Providence. In the following years she taught at high schools in Louisiana and Oklahoma. She was a faculty advisory member of honor society Sigma Zeta's Sigma chapter at OLLU, serving as national vice-president from 1964 to 1965 and as national president from 1965 to 1966.

She was the first woman and fourth person to serve as president of Our Lady of the Lake University (OLLU) in San Antonio, taking the office in 1978. She oversaw OLLU's introduction of a weekend college program in the late 1970s. Following her resignation in 1997, she held the title of OLLU president emerita. In September 2000, the Sueltenfuss Library at OLLU was dedicated in her honor.

During her career in education, she was treasurer and director of the Independent Colleges and Universities of Texas, as well as director of the Association of Texas Colleges and Universities. Sueltenfuss was inducted into the San Antonio Women's Hall of Fame in 1985, and served as president of the organization from 1993–1995.

She was awarded the Yellow Rose of Texas Education Award by the Constance Allen Guild for Lifetime Learning, and was a member of the San Antonio chapter of Zonta International.

Sueltenfuss was posthumously inducted into the Texas Women's Hall of Fame on January 17, 2019 at a ceremony in Austin.

Further reading

First European Trip, 1963

References

1921 births
2009 deaths
American women educators
Educators from Texas
Congregation of Divine Providence
University of Notre Dame alumni
Our Lady of the Lake University alumni
20th-century American Roman Catholic nuns
21st-century American Roman Catholic nuns